A. F. M. Abdul Moyeen (born: 1964) is a Bangladeshi educationalist. He is a professor in the Department of Management at Dhaka University and the current Vice-Chancellor of Comilla University.

Early life and education
He was born in 1964 in Kotalipara, Gopalganj.

Moyeen passed his secondary from Barisal Zilla School and higher secondary from Brojomohun College, Barishal. He received his B. Com (Bachelor) degree in 1984 and M. Com degree in 1985 from the Department of Management of Dhaka University. He holds a PhD in strategic management from the University of Stirling in Scotland, and completed post-doctoral research at the Australian National University.

Career
A. F. M. Abdul Moyeen has taught at Dhaka University and Federation University Australia. He also has experience of working with various international organizations. He joined Comilla University as Vice-Chancellor on 31 January 2022.

Publications
He has published research articles in national and international journals.

References 

1964 births
Bangladeshi educators
University of Dhaka alumni
People from Gopalganj District, Bangladesh
Living people